Lineage II is a massively multiplayer online role-playing game (MMORPG) for Microsoft Windows and the second game in the Lineage series. It is a prequel to Lineage and is set 150 years before the first game. It has become popular since its October 1, 2003 launch in South Korea, reporting 1,000,918 unique users during the month of March 2007. To date, the game has been played by more than 14 million users, most of whom are based in Asia.

Lineage II adopted a free-to-play model in Lineage II: Goddess of Destruction, with all game content being free except for "purchasable in-game store items and packs" in November 2011. A prequel, Lineage 2: Revolution, was released as a mobile game in 2016.

Lineage 2M was launched for the first time in South Korea in November 2019.

Gameplay 
The first thing a player does when playing Lineage II is to create a character. They can choose their character's race and personalise the character's face and hair. However, the gameplay allows many options for personalisation of the character visuals: for example, the player can choose attributes and traits like a hairstyle, hair colour, facial expression, and gender among other features.

Every player has to begin the game in a temple in their character's race's zone (for example: Humans start in "Talking Island" and the Dark Elves in "The Shilen Temple"). Most commonly, the player can choose between a mage and a fighter in each race except Dwarves and Kamael, which can be only fighters.

Battles 
A major part of Lineage II gameplay is the combat. Monsters can be found outside of Towns on the hunting fields or deep inside underground dungeons. When the player defeats a monster, their character gets XP and SP to help them level up and learn new skills.

Players can also fight other players through a PvP system.

Death 
If a player's character dies in battle, they are given the option to resurrect in the nearest town or village. They can also wait for another player to resurrect them with a Resurrection scroll or spell. Resurrecting in the nearest town will costs a fraction of the XP gained, which grows exponentially with level. Resurrection spells and elite scrolls generally restore some of the lost experience.

Plot 
The game follows a fictional history through sets of plots called "Sagas". There are currently four sagas: "The Chaotic Chronicle", "The Chaotic Throne", "Goddess of Destruction", and "Epic Tale of Aden". Large-scale updates/expansions are known as "Chronicles" (also known as "The Throne" in The Chaotic Throne, "Chapter" in Goddess of Destruction, and "Episode" in Epic Tale of Aden), which introduce new story elements as well as new features and add-ons. They are released every six months. Each expansion new skills, quests, areas, and items. Some expansion also increased the level cap.

Characters 
Characters play the role as a player's avatar within the game. Players are allowed to elect up to 7 characters per account. There are currently seven races in the world of Lineage II: the Humans, who are similar to modern-day humans and who have all-around balanced characteristics; the Elves, who have superior dexterity, movement, and casting speed, but weaker offense; Dark Elves, who have higher magic and melee attack capabilities; Orcs, who have higher HP and MP but slower movement; Dwarves, who are powerful melee attackers and master craftsmen; Kamael, who are humanoids with single wings and gender-specific job classes; and Ertheia, female warriors with two completely unique classes, and different quest lines.

Development 
Hyeong-Jin Kim, the production team head for Lineage II, came up with the basic concept for the game in early 2000. Development happened in October–November of the same year. Kim and producer James Bae have stated that their reasons for developing a prequel for Lineage rather than a sequel is that "Lineage will continue to be updated as a game", and that "by working on its past, we will not be risking conflict with the direction of updates that Lineage will take in the future".

According to Kim and Bae, the game's initial subtitle, "The Chaotic Chronicle", was developed with the intention to "express the large-scale war, strategies, conflicts, and collaborations that we hope to encourage among players".

Lead Game Designer Raoul Kim said that the reason for rendering Lineage II in 3D was "simply because most games today are [also] using 3D graphics", and because they deemed it "more appropriate than 2D for the things that [they] were going to create". Developers chose to use the Unreal Engine 2 game engine because of its ability to render outdoor scenes and its powerful editing features.

According to Game Design team head, Cheol-Woong Hwang, there were different concepts for each of the race's home villages. He described the concept for the human village in Talking Island as "ordinary", while the Elven Village was designed "so as not to lose the natural and royal high-class feeling". They designed the Dark Elven village based on a "grotesque and serious feeling in order to express the rough history of these who had been expelled from the Elves". There are three versions of Lineage II available presently - classic, essence and Fafurion. Where the classic bears the same look and feel of the game as it was decade back, the others have specific functions.

Reception 

The overall reception for Lineage II is mixed; the game received average review scores from various video game rating websites. Andrew Park of GameSpot said that the game "offers either a repetitive grind or a stiff challenge", and is not suitable for casual gamers who can only play an hour or less per day. Allen "Delsyn" Rausch called the Kamael "an interesting race in that, unlike other Lineage II races, they focus specifically on the warrior path with high-level class paths segregated by gender".

The Chronicle 5: Oath of Blood expansion won the Expansion of the Year award at Stratics Central Editor's Choice Awards 2006, and Lineage II earned an Honorable Mention for the Game of the Year award.

Legacy 
Lineage II is one of the MMOs that were subject to ethnographic study in Constance Steinkuehler and Dmitri Williams's article, "Where Everybody Knows Your (Screen) Name: Online Games as 'Third Places'".

Lineage 2 M 
Lineage 2 M is a mobile port version of Lineage II. It was released on November 27, 2019.

Prequel 

A prequel, Lineage 2: Revolution, was released as a mobile game in 2016.

Sequel 

NCsoft officially announced Project TL as the sequel to the first Lineage in November 2011. The first gameplay videos debuted at the G-Star 2011 gaming convention in South Korea on November 10.

Content patches 

The Chaotic Chronicles

The Chaotic Throne

Goddess of Destruction (Free2Play)

The Conquest of Echelon
There was story of three brothers from the west that stood at the doorsteps of heavens gates and ruled the lands of Goddard with an Iron fist until one day with the snap of their Ruler Sylurs finger, half of the population of Goddard was gone and so two the brothers Echelon.
Epic Tale Of Aden

References

External links 
 U.S. official site
 EU official site

2003 video games
2004 video games
Active massively multiplayer online games
Lineage (series)
Massively multiplayer online role-playing games
NCSoft games
Unreal Engine games
Video game prequels
Video games scored by Inon Zur
Video games developed in South Korea
Windows games
Windows-only games
Innova (video game company) games